The 1997–98 North West Counties Football League season was the 16th in the history of the North West Counties Football League, a football competition in England. Teams were divided into two divisions: Division One and Division Two.

Division One 

Division One featured four new teams:

 Atherton Laburnum Rovers, relegated from the NPL Division One
 Haslingden, promoted as runners-up of Division Two
 Ramsbottom United, promoted as champions of Division Two
 Warrington Town, relegated from the NPL Division One

League table

Division Two 

Division Two featured three new teams:

 Bootle, relegated from Division One
 Fleetwood Freeport, a new team
 Woodley Sports, joined from the Manchester League

League table

References

External links 
 NWCFL Official Site

North West Counties Football League seasons
8